Rachna or Rachana may refer to:

Rachana (film), a 1983 Malayalam film by Mohan
Rachana, a village in the district of Batroun, North Lebanon
Rachana (butterfly), a genus of butterflies
Rachana (typeface), a Malayalam typeface 
Rachana Banerjee (born 1974), Indian Film actress
Rachana Narayanankutty (born 1983), Indian Film actress.
Rachna Khatau (born 1981), Indian-American film and stage actress.
Rachana Malayalam, a Unicode-compliant Malayalam operating system 
Rachna Doab, a region in Punjab
Rachna Engineering University, a University located in Gujranwala, Punjab, Pakistan